Confusopoly (aka Dilbert's confusopoly) is confusing marketing designed to prevent the buyer from making informed decisions. The term was invented by Scott Adams in his comic strip Dilbert. Adams defined a confusopoly as "a group of companies with similar products who intentionally confuse customers instead of competing on price". For example, similar items like mobile phones are advertised at various price plans according to different combinations of available minutes, text messaging capabilities and other services, thus making these offers practically incomparable when it could be easy to price similar units of usage to allow informed comparisons. The term confusopoly also applies because confusion within the targeted consumer group is purposefully maintained, so choices are based on emotional factors.

The term has been adopted by economists. Consumer Financial Protection Bureau director Richard Cordray, championing meaningful regulation for the financial industry, used the term confusopoly to refer to large financial institutions (4'04"4'26") :

See also 
 The Dilbert Future
 "The Market for Lemons" and lemon law
 The sexual interference hypothesis is a comparable phenomenon, involving display and mate choice, that occurs in biological systems.

References 

Imperfect competition